Matheus Henrique Teixeira (born 8 March 1999), known as Matheus Teixeira, is a Brazilian footballer who plays as a goalkeeper for Oita Trinita, on loan from Bahia.

Club career
Born in José Bonifácio, São Paulo, Matheus Teixeira joined Palmeiras' youth setup in 2013, aged 14. In July 2019, he left the club and joined fellow Série A club Bahia.

Promoted to the first team in 2020, Matheus Teixeira was initially a fourth-choice behind Douglas Friedrich, Anderson and Mateus Claus. He made his senior debut on 3 March 2021, starting in a 0–1 Campeonato Baiano home loss against UNIRB.

In April 2021, after Douglas tested positive for COVID-19 and Mateus Claus was injured, Matheus Teixeira became the first-choice, and helped their side to reach the finals of the 2021 Copa do Nordeste after saving two penalties.

Career statistics

Honours
Bahia
Campeonato Baiano: 2020
Copa do Nordeste: 2021

References

External links

1999 births
Living people
Footballers from São Paulo (state)
Brazilian footballers
Association football goalkeepers
Campeonato Brasileiro Série A players
Esporte Clube Bahia players